The Ministry of Botanical Gardens and Public Recreation is the Sri Lankan government ministry.

List of ministers

The Minister of Botanical Gardens and Public Recreation is an appointment in the Cabinet of Sri Lanka.

Parties

See also
 List of ministries of Sri Lanka

References

External links
 Government of Sri Lanka

Botanical Gardens and Public Recreation
Botanical Gardens and Public Recreation